Blud (Russian, Ukrainian: Блуд), one of the Slavic fairies in Slavic mythology, is an evil-deity that causes disorientation and leads a person aimlessly around and round. The term also refers to illicit fornication, the desire for which Slavic clerics claimed to come from the Devil.

Also Blud (Блуд) in russian language means: debauchery, adultery and deviation from the straight path in the literal and figurative sense.

References

Slavic legendary creatures